Philipp Haelg (born November 3, 1991) is a Liechtensteiner cross-country skier from Liechtenstein. He competed for Liechtenstein at the 2014 Winter Olympics in the 15 kilometre classical and 30 kilometre skiathlon races.

He announced his retirement from competitive skiing in March 2017.

See also
Liechtenstein at the 2014 Winter Olympics

References 

1991 births
Living people
Cross-country skiers at the 2014 Winter Olympics
Liechtenstein male cross-country skiers
Olympic cross-country skiers of Liechtenstein